Gary Hemming (December 13, 1934 – August 6, 1969) was a noted American mountaineer. Together with Royal Robbins he made the first ascent of the American Direct route on the Aiguille du Dru in Chamonix in 1962, and was widely known in France for his role as a rescuer of a party on the same mountain in 1966, earning him the moniker "le beatnik des cimes".

Hemming was also part of the group which put up the first ascent of the south face of the Aiguille du Fou (with John Harlin, Tom Frost and Stewart Fulton) a spire of sheer rock long deemed to be unclimbable.

Hemming died from a self-inflicted gunshot wound outside the Jenny Lake campground in Grand Teton National Park in 1969. Hemming is widely thought to be one of the models for the character named Rand in the James Salter book Solo Faces.

Quotes about Hemming 

"Hemming. The name is singular, like the man." — Jack Turner
"Gary was big, rawboned tough, and light-haired and had uncannily blue eyes. His most arresting physical feature was his grin. It combined the innocence of a friendly, lively eight-year-old and the cynicism of an old satyr who has seen it all. He was reckless with his passions, had an insatiable appetite for what he (and I) called life, and an alarming capacity for suffering." — Pete Sinclair

References

Further reading
Tenderini, Mirella. "Gary Hemming: The Beatnik of the Alps." Yosemite, Sentinel Rock Press. 2015.
Harlin III, John. The Eiger Obsession: Facing the Mountain That Killed My Father. New York: Simon and Schuster: 2007.
Krakauer, Jon. Eiger Dreams: Ventures among Men and Mountains. New York: Lyons & Burford. 1990.
Sinclair, Pete. We Aspired: The Last Innocent Americans. Logan, Utah: Utah State University, 1993.
Turner, Jack. Teewinot: Climbing and Contemplating the Teton Range. New York: Thomas Dunne Books, 2000.

1934 births
1969 deaths
American mountain climbers
1969 suicides
Suicides by firearm in Wyoming